Um Lugar ao Sol (English title: In Your Place) is a Brazilian telenovela produced and broadcast by TV Globo. It premiered on 8 November 2021, and ended on 25 March 2022. The telenovela is written by Lícia Manzo, with the collaboration of Carla Madeira, Cecília Giannetti, Leonardo Moreira, and Marta Góes. It stars Cauã Reymond, Alinne Moraes, Andreia Horta, Marco Ricca, Andréa Beltrão, and Marieta Severo.

The series follows Christian who, after the death of his twin brother Christofer, decides to take his place, leaving behind his great love and identity.

Plot 
In Goiânia, twin brothers Christian and Christofer are born, lose their mother in childbirth and are left with their father Ernani, who, because of his situation, agrees to give one of his children to a rich couple from Rio de Janeiro, marking the separation of both of the twins when they are about to a year old. Christian is sent to an orphanage, while Christofer is renamed Renato by his adoptive parents. Both grow up unaware of each other's existence.

18 years later, as he says goodbye to his dying his adoptive father, Renato discovers he is adopted and has twin brother from whom he was separated. Outraged, he confronts his adopted mother Elenice, who lies to him, saying that his brother and his biological father are dead. Christian, is forced to leave the orphanage for minors where he grew up, in Goiânia, and also discovers he has been separated from his brother. Dedicated to school and alone in the world and without prospects, becomes underemployed, Christian is forced to shelve his dreams, and only the existence of his brother seems to light up his life. In the hope of finding Renato, he decides to go to Rio de Janeiro. Before leaving he says goodbye to Ravi, his brother at heart, raised in the orphanage with him. Renato goes to Europe with a one-way ticket, willing to stay away from the life he has discovered to be fake.

Ten years later, Christian works as a street vendor at the door of the Nilton Santos Olympic Stadium in the hope of finding his brother. His only clue is a magazine clipping where a man identical to him is watching a match from the stadium's grandstand. Christian meets Lara and falls in love with her. He gives up searching for his twin brother and decides to propose to Lara and start a small business. However, when Ravi is arrested for a theft he did not commit, Christian needs to raise the bail money and with no alternative, he agrees to do a cart for drug dealers and, inadvertently, incurs an even bigger debt. Threatened with death and with no way out, Lara tells him to sell what they have to free Ravi from prison and flee to her grandmother's house in Minas Gerais.

During the escape, Christian randomly meets Renato, who has just returned to Brazil. After spending the early morning together and learning of his Christian’s debt, Renato goes up the hill in his place and, mistaken for him, is killed by the drug dealers. Identical to Renato, Christian emulates his brother's personality and behavior, becoming his double. He decides to leave the past behind, and assumes the identity of Renato, with Ravi as his only confidant, he watches Lara bury the body that was supposedly his, and moves on to a new life, having to deal with the consequences of his choice.

Cast 
 Cauã Reymond as Christian and Christofer / Renato
 Alinne Moraes as Bárbara
 Andreia Horta as Lara
 Marco Ricca as Breno
 José de Abreu as Santiago
 Andréa Beltrão as Rebeca
 Marieta Severo as Noca
 Juan Paiva as Ravi
 Ana Beatriz Nogueira as Elenice
 Lorena Comparato as Young Elenice
 Daniel Dantas as Túlio
 Ana Baird as Nicole 
 Mariana Lima as Ilana
 Lara Tremouroux as Joy
 Fernanda de Freitas as Erica
 Danton Mello as Matheus
 Fernando Eiras as Teodoro
 Pathy Dejesus as Ruth
 Yara de Novaes as Inácia
 Stella Freitas as Geize
 Ju Colombo as Dalva

 Fernanda Marques as Cecília
 Bruna Martins as Bela
 Samantha Jones as Adel
 Miguel Schmid as Luan
 Maju Lima as Marie
 Maithê Rodrigues as Yasmin

 Kelly Morales as Thais
 Natália Lage as Gabriela
 Renata Gaspar
 Regina Braga as Ana Virgínia 
 Denise Fraga as Júlia
 Gabriel Leone as Felipe 
 Cláudia Missura as Lucília
 Rui Resende
 Miguel Schmidith as Luan

Guest stars 
 Patrícia Selonk as Gorete
 Ângela Figueiredo as Mercedes
 Mayara Theresa as Leila
 Pável Reymond as Josias
 Sofia Teixeira as Rosário
 Tonico Pereira as Romero
 Inez Viana as Avany
 Márcio Vito as Ernani Alves dos Santos
 Gery as Young Ernani
 Genézio de Barros as José Renato Meirelles
 Rafael Primot as Young José Renato
 Raquel Rocha

Production 
In January 2020, casting for the telenovela began. The following month, the first scenes began to be filmed in Prague, Czech Republic. In March 2020, due to the COVID-19 pandemic, Globo suspended indefinitely production of the telenovela, which was scheduled to premiere in May. Filming resumed in November 2020 under strict health protocols, and concluded on 24 September 2021.

Receptin

Ratings 

Premiering after more than a year of postponements and following the reruns of three telenovelas, Um Lugar ao Sol saw the worst pilot-episode rating for the traditional primetime slot, drawing a rating of 25.2 points and audience share (proportion of televisions turned on) of 38.7%, worse than the previous lows of a 30.6 rating and a 40.3% audience share set by A Lei do Amor on 3 October 2016.

The lowest rating for the timeslot in recent history was recorded for the eighth episode of Um Lugar ao Sol on 16 November 2021, which was delayed to because a 2022 FIFA World Cup qualification match. The episode drew a rating of 15.6 points was lower than the 16.2 points figure scored by O Sétimo Guardião on 24 December 2018. Compared against the shows that aired on 16 November 2021, Um Lugar ao Sol, in a rare instance, fared worse than the competing RecordTV telenovela Gênesis, which scored 15.8 points.

On Christmas Eve, when television audiences are typically smaller, the 41st episode of Um Lugar ao Sol registered another record-breaking low of 15.4 points.

Awards and nominations

References

External links 

TV Globo telenovelas
Brazilian telenovelas
Portuguese-language telenovelas
Television series about twins
2020s Brazilian television series
2021 Brazilian television series debuts
2022 Brazilian television series endings
2021 telenovelas
Alcohol abuse in television